Percy Quin State Park is a public recreation area located off Interstate 55, approximately  southwest of McComb, Mississippi. The state park surrounds  Lake Tangipahoa, an impoundment of the Tangipahoa River.

History
The park is one of the nine original state parks built in Mississippi by the Civilian Conservation Corps. Work on the park began in 1935, with construction of the dam that created Lake Tangipahoa initiated in 1936. The park was named after Mississippi politician Percy Quin.

Activities and amenities
The park features boating, waterskiing and fishing, a conference center, primitive and developed campsites, cabins, villas, and lodge, a  nature trail, picnic area, and an 18-hole golf course, Quail Hollow.

References

External links
Percy Quin State Park Mississippi Department of Wildlife, Fisheries, and Parks
Percy Quin State Park Map Mississippi Department of Wildlife, Fisheries, and Parks

State parks of Mississippi
Protected areas of Pike County, Mississippi